The first season of Burmese reality talent show The Voice Myanmar premiered on February 18, 2018 on MRTV-4. Kyar Pauk, Ni Ni Khin Zaw, Yan Yan Chan and Lynn Lynn were coaches for this season.

Blind auditions
The first episode of the Blind auditions premiered on February 18, 2018.

Color key

Episode 1 (Feb. 18)

Episode 2 (Feb. 25)

Episode 3 (Mar. 4)

Episode 4 (Mar. 11)

Episode 5 (Mar. 18)

Episode 6 (Mar. 25)

The Battles 
The Battle Rounds were broadcast from Sunday, April 1, 2018, to Sunday, April 22, 2018.

Color key

Live shows
The live shows were aired on April 29.

Color key

Week 1: 1st Live shows (April.29)

Week 2: 2nd Live shows  (May.6)

Week 3: 3rd Live shows  (May.13)

Week 4: 4th Live shows  (May.20)

Week 5: Live shows semi-finals (May.27)

Week 6: Finale (June.3)

References

The Voice Myanmar